Major John Darling Young, JP (1910 – 1988) was Lord Lieutenant of Buckinghamshire from 1969 to 1984.

He served in the Second World War with the Life Guards. 

In addition to the Lord Lieutenancy, he also served as High Sheriff of Buckinghamshire for 1960, and as a member of Buckinghamshire County Council for Buckingham.

External links
Biography

1910 births
1988 deaths
British Life Guards officers
High Sheriffs of Buckinghamshire
Knights of the Order of St John
People from Buckingham
Members of Buckinghamshire County Council
Lord-Lieutenants of Buckinghamshire
British Army personnel of World War II